Bristol College was an Episcopal manual labor college located near Bristol, Pennsylvania. It was established on October 2, 1833, by the Episcopal Education Society of Philadelphia. The Rev. Chauncey Colton (1800–1876) was its only president. The institution closed in February 1837 for lack of financial support.

History
The college was built on the banks of the Delaware River two miles from Bristol, Pennsylvania. The White Hall of the college, built by Alexander Jackson Davis in Greek Revival style, is on the National Register of Historic Places. Bristol College was used as a hospital during the American Civil War, and from 1868 through the 1880s as an orphanage for the children of colored soldiers. The center columned section of the last remaining building, White Hall was condemned and later demolished in the 1980s. The East and West wings still stand and act as apartments.

Pennsylvania Literary, Scientific, and Military Academy
The Pennsylvania Literary, Scientific, and Military Academy was established on the former Bristol College building and grounds on September 5, 1842, by Captain Alden Partridge, and was conducted by him until April 1845, when it was discontinued and reopened at Harrisburg, on April 14th, of the same year. The academy was conducted by the graduates and past cadets of Norwich University. Henry V. Morris, served as the professor of Mathematics and Tactics from 1843 to 1845; Alvan E. Bovay was in charge of the Classical Department from 1843 to 1844; and Edward M. Brown was instructor of Mathematics from April 1844 to April 1845.

Notable people
 Gregory Thurston Bedell Bishop of Ohio (Episcopal Church)
 William Muhlenberg Hiester
 Benjamin Chew Tilghman
 Richard Grant White literary scholar and critic (Father of Stanford White).
 William N. Pendleton faculty mathematics teacher, Episcopal priest, and Confederate Brigadier General during the U.S. Civil War
 John Celivergos Zachos U.S. Civil War Army Surgeon and Educator.
 Benjamin Blake Minor

Further reading
 
 
A History of Bristol Borough in the County of Bucks, State of Pennsylvania by Doron Green 1911

References

External links
 White Hall of Bristol College, 701-721 Shadyside Avenue, Croydon, Bucks County, PA: 6 photos, 2 data pages, and 1 photo caption page at Historic American Buildings Survey
 Pennsylvania Colleges that have Closed, Merged, Changed Names

1834 establishments in Pennsylvania
1837 disestablishments in Pennsylvania
Educational institutions established in 1834
Educational institutions disestablished in 1837
Alexander Jackson Davis buildings
Apartment buildings in Pennsylvania
Buildings and structures on the Delaware River
Defunct private universities and colleges in Pennsylvania
Episcopal Church in Pennsylvania
Greek Revival architecture in Pennsylvania
Historic American Buildings Survey in Pennsylvania
Liberal arts colleges in Pennsylvania
National Register of Historic Places in Bucks County, Pennsylvania
School buildings on the National Register of Historic Places in Pennsylvania
Seminaries and theological colleges in Pennsylvania
Universities and colleges affiliated with the Episcopal Church (United States)
Universities and colleges in Bucks County, Pennsylvania
Ruins in the United States